Bridgeport High School can refer to:
In the USA
Bridgeport High School — Bridgeport, Connecticut now called Central High School
 Bridgeport High School — Bridgeport, Illinois (opened in 1880s; closed in 1973)
Bridgeport High School — Bridgeport, Michigan
Bridgeport High School — Bridgeport, Nebraska
Bridgeport High School — Bridgeport, Ohio
Bridgeport Academy High — Bridgeport, Texas
Bridgeport High School — Bridgeport, Texas
Bridgeport High School — Bridgeport, Washington
Bridgeport High School — Bridgeport, West Virginia
Bridgeport Aurora High School — Bridgeport, Washington
Bridgeport Community Correctional Center — Bridgeport, Connecticut
Bridgeport-Spaulding Alternative Education School — Saginaw, Michigan

Elsewhere
Bridgeport High School — Jamaica